Super Chinese I+II Advance is a compilation of remakes of Super Chinese and Super Chinese 2 released in 2004 for the Game Boy Advance. Super Chinese Labyrinth, a puzzle game, is also included.

Gameplay

Super Chinese
Super Chinese is action game where the player must defeat a number of enemies in order to advance to the next area. The player has a punching attack and a jumping attack.

Super Chinese 2
Super Chinese 2 is vastly different from its predecessor, incorporating role-playing video game elements into the gameplay. The game features random encounter battles with action role-playing game elements, including experience points awarded, which increases the level of the character.

Super Chinese Labyrinth
Super Chinese Labyrinth is a puzzle game featuring the cast of the Super Chinese games. The player guides the character through puzzles involving the moving of different colored blocks through obstacles onto colored tiles.

External links
Super Chinese I+II Advance at GameFAQs

Role-playing video games
Super Chinese
Game Boy Advance games
Game Boy Advance-only games
Japan-exclusive video games
Video game compilations
Action role-playing video games
2004 video games
Video games developed in Japan
Single-player video games